Mogambo is a 1953 American film.

Mogambo may also refer to:

 Mogambo (horse) (foaled 1983), a retired American Thoroughbred racehorse
 Mogambo, the main villain in Mr. India, a 1987 Indian film
 "Mogambo", a 2018 single by Riz Ahmed from The Long Goodbye

See also
 Mocambo (disambiguation)